Andronicus, Probus (Provos), and Tarachus (Tharacus, Tarachos) were martyrs of the Diocletian persecution (about 304 AD). According to tradition, Tarachus was beaten with stones. Probus was thrashed with whips, his back and sides were pierced with heated spits; finally he also was cut up with knives. Andronicus was also cut to pieces with knives.

Narrative
According to the Acts, Tarachus (ca. 239- 304), a Roman who was a native of Claudiopolis in Isauria and a former soldier, the plebeian Probus of Side in Pamphylia, and the patrician Andronicus, who belonged to a prominent family of Ephesus, were tried by the governor Numerian Maximus and horribly tortured three times in various cities, including Tarsus, Mopsuestia, and Anazarbus of Cilicia.

According to tradition, Tarachus was beaten with stones. Probus was thrashed with whips, his feet were burned with red hot irons, his back and sides were pierced with heated spits; finally he also was cut up with knives. Andronicus was also cut to pieces with knives.

They were then condemned to death by wild beasts, and when the animals would not touch them in the amphitheatre they were put to death with the sword. Three men, named Marcian, Felix, and Verus, witnessed their martyrdom and added an epilogue to the saints' Acts.  They retrieved the bodies of the three saints, buried them, and watched over them the rest of their lives, requesting that they be buried in the same vault as the martyrs at the end of theirs.

There are two accounts of their martyrdom, the first account being held by Thierry Ruinart to be entirely authentic. Harnack, however, expressed doubts as to the genuineness of the account, and Hippolyte Delehaye puts the martyrdom in the class of legends of martyrs that he calls "historical romances".  

Their feast is celebrated in the Roman Catholic Church on October 11, and in the Greek Orthodox Church on October 12.

See also
 Andronicus, Probus, and Tarachus, patron saint archive

References

External links

 Provos, Andronicus, and Tarachos
 Lives of the Saints

239 births
304 deaths
Saints from Roman Anatolia
Saints trios
Groups of Christian martyrs of the Roman era
4th-century Christian martyrs
3rd-century Romans
4th-century Romans